The Quinte Conservation is a conservation authority in the province of Ontario. It is headquartered in Belleville, Ontario. Quinte Conservation was created as a result of the amalgamation of three local conservation authorities in 1996; Moira River, Prince Edward Region and the Napanee Region authorities. 

The authority was established in 1995, but the three conservation authorities that make up Quinte Conservation were created much earlier: Moira and Napanee were both formed in 1947, with Prince Edward Region formed in 1965.

Both Moira and Napanee were quick to respond following the passage of the Conservation Authorities Act in 1946,
legislated by the provincial government that year in response to a concern expressed by agricultural, naturalist
and sportsman's groups who felt the province's renewable natural resources were in an unhealthy state. Although the
responsibility for managing natural resources lay within the province, the extent of erosion and water concerns was
such that a new approach was deemed necessary. Years of drought and deforestation had led to extensive soil loss and flooding in the province and the time had come to regroup and address growing conservation issues.

Conservation authorities
By 1947, half a dozen municipalities had already accepted the responsibility of urging the government of Ontario to
form an authority within their watershed jurisdictions. These newly formed conservation authorities would have
jurisdiction over one or more individual watersheds, charged with the responsibility of addressing flooding issues
in a complete and rational way. By having the power to establish regulations, these Authorities were now able to
protect life and property, flood prone areas from building encroachment, and erosion problems. For example, in the
wake of Hurricane Hazel in Toronto in 1954, which devastated that city with torrential rains and extensive
flooding, the Toronto and Region Conservation Authority was formed to ensure that such destruction and loss of life
would never happen again.

Since this rather humble beginning in 1946, today's 36 conservation authorities operate in watersheds in which 90
percent of the provincial population resides. Managing Ontario's watershed resources is a massive undertaking
involving foresters, ecologists, planners, local municipal members, engineers, agroscientists, educators, and a host of others, who work harmoniously together with watershed residents in addressing conservation related
problems within their watershed.

Moira River Conservation Authority
The Moira River Conservation Authority was formed July 31, 1947. It is part of a large system of rivers, creeks and
lakes that drains an area of almost 3,000 square kilometres. Due to the Moira watershed's history of serious floods the province declared the MRCA in 1984 as the lead agency in protecting lives and property from the
dangers of flooding. Quinte Conservation owns  of public conservation lands of which 12 are
conservation areas within the watershed area of the Moira River.

Napanee Region Conservation Authority
The Napanee Region Conservation Authority was formed November 20, 1947, comprising about 2,000 square
kilometres. Quinte Conservation owns  of public conservation lands of which 9 are conservation
areas within the watersheds of the Salmon and Napanee Rivers.

Prince Edward Region Conservation Authority
The Prince Edward Region Conservation Authority was formed December 9, 1965, encompassing over 1,000
square kilometres. Quinte Conservation owns and maintains  of conservation lands, all of which are
conservation areas (14) within Prince Edward County.

With the amalgamation of these three conservation authorities in 1996, in the wake of provincial budget
constraints, Quinte Conservation became a provincial leader in streamlining operations while still providing an
excellent level of service to its municipalities.

Conservation areas
Beaver Meadow Wildlife Area
Deerock Lake Conservation Area
Depot Lakes Conservation Area and Campground
H.R. Frink Conservation Area and Outdoor Education Centre
Little Bluff Conservation Area
Macaulay Mountain Conservation Area
Massassauga Point Conservation Area
O'Hara Mill Homestead and Conservation Area
Potter's Creek Conservation Area
Sheffield Conservation Area
Sidney Conservation Area 
Vanderwater Conservation Area

External links

Belleville, Ontario

Conservation authorities in Ontario